The 1977 Grand Prix German Open was a combined men's and women's tennis tournament played on outdoor red clay courts. It was the 69th edition of the event and was part of the 1977 Colgate-Palmolive Grand Prix circuit and categorized as a four-star event. It took place at the Am Rothenbaum in Hamburg, West Germany, from 9 May through 15 May 1977. Paolo Bertolucci, after a victory in the final over title-holder Manuel Orantes, and Laura duPont won the singles titles .

Finals

Men's singles
 Paolo Bertolucci defeated  Manuel Orantes 6–3, 4–6, 6–2, 6–3

Women's singles
 Laura duPont defeated  Heidi Eisterlehner 6–1, 6–4

Men's doubles
 'Bob Hewitt /  Karl Meiler defeated  Phil Dent /  Kim Warwick 3–6, 6–3, 6–4, 6–4

Women's doubles
 Linky Boshoff /  Ilana Kloss defeated  Regina Maršíková /  Renáta Tomanová 2–6, 6–4, 7–5

References

External links
  
   
 Association of Tennis Professionals (ATP) tournament profile
 International Tennis Federation (ITF) tournament edition details

German Open
Hamburg European Open
1977 in West German sport
1977 in German tennis